The 1998 Wales rugby union tour of Africa was a series of matches played in June 1998 in Zimbabwe and South Africa by Wales national rugby union team.

Wales won their initial match against Zimbabwe in Harare, before moving on to the second leg of the tour in South Africa. Here they would play four tour matches against representative and provincial opposition and a test match against South Africa. Wales lost all four of the tour matches, and then were defeated by South Africa in the test match. The final scoreline of 96-13 was the biggest defeat Wales had ever had, and remains so .

Wales' head coach Kevin Bowring had resigned at the end of the 1998 Five Nations Championship, and with a replacement yet to be appointed, Dennis John was made caretaker coach ahead of the tour. Prior to the tour, 18 players from Wales made themselves unavailable to participate, while a further 8 picked up injuries during the tour.

Results 
Scores and results list Wales's points tally first.

References

1998 rugby union tours
1997–98 in Welsh rugby union
1998
1998 in South African rugby union
1998
1998
1998 in African rugby union
rugby union
History of rugby union matches between South Africa and Wales